is a private university in Matsubara, Osaka, Japan. It was founded in 1965.

References

External links 
 Official website (Japanese)
 Official website (English)

Private universities and colleges in Japan
Universities and colleges in Osaka Prefecture
Kansai Collegiate American Football League